Ioulietta Boukouvala (born 28 August 1983) is a Greek judoka. She competed at the 2004 and 2012 Summer Olympics. During the Women's 57 kg event at the 2012 Games, Boukouvala claimed she was bitten by her Cuban opponent, Yurileidys Lupetey Cobas, in their first round bout.

References

External links
 
 

1983 births
Living people
Greek female judoka
Olympic judoka of Greece
Judoka at the 2004 Summer Olympics
Judoka at the 2012 Summer Olympics
Sportspeople from Ioannina
Mediterranean Games gold medalists for Greece
Mediterranean Games silver medalists for Greece
Competitors at the 2005 Mediterranean Games
Competitors at the 2009 Mediterranean Games
Mediterranean Games medalists in judo
21st-century Greek women